Kandeh Kandi (also Romanized as Kandeh Kandī; also known as Kandeh) is a village in Salavat Rural District, Moradlu District, Meshgin Shahr County, Ardabil Province, Iran. At the 2006 census, its population was 459, in 94 families.

References 

Towns and villages in Meshgin Shahr County